Ewerton may refer to:

People known by the mononym
 Ewerton (footballer, born 1989), Ewerton José Almeida Santos, Brazilian football centre-back
 Ewerton (footballer, born 1992), Ewerton da Silva Pereira, Brazilian football midfielder
 Ewerton (footballer, born 1996), Ewerton Paixao da Silva, Brazilian football winger

People with the given name
 Ewerton Teixeira (born 1982), Brazilian kickboxer
 Ewerton Páscoa (born 1989), Brazilian football defender

See also
 Everton (disambiguation)
 Ewerthon (born 1981), Ewerthon Henrique de Souza, Brazilian football forward